Upton-by-Chester is a civil parish in Cheshire West and Chester, England. It contains eight buildings that are recorded in the National Heritage List for England as designated listed buildings, all of which are listed at Grade II.  This grade is the lowest of the three gradings given to listed buildings and is applied to "buildings of national importance and special interest".  Part of the parish is a suburb of the city of Chester. It also contains the Countess of Chester Hospital, and part of Chester Zoo. The listed buildings consist of two structures associated with the hospital, a former country house now located within the zoo, a church, a former windmill, a cottage, a war memorial, and a boundary stone.

References
Citations

Sources

Listed buildings in Cheshire West and Chester
Lists of listed buildings in Cheshire